Danny Liddell is a Scottish former footballer who played at outside right. He played with St Johnstone F.C. between 1958 and 1962.  Signed from Clydebank Juniors on 13 December 1958, transferred to Stenhousemuir on 10 March 1962. Liddell played 41 games, scored eight goals.

He is the brother of Johnny Liddell, a centre forward, also of St Johnstone.

Sources
Neilbrown.newcastlefans.com
Scottish-football-historical-archive.com
Webservicesbc.com

Scottish footballers
Year of birth missing
Possibly living people
Clydebank Juniors F.C. players
St Johnstone F.C. players
Stenhousemuir F.C. players
Scottish Football League players
Association football wingers